The Odyssey Symphony is Robert W. Smith's second symphonic band symphony.  Smith had studied both the Odyssey and Dante's Divine Comedy at Troy University.  

The symphony contains, in total, four movements, each being noted for having intricate and imaginative percussive and wind effects.  They are as follows:

Movement One:  "The Iliad"
Subtitled "...in the 10th Year of the Trojan War", this piece retells the story of the incredible victory of the Greeks against the Trojans, using the famous "Trojan Horse".  The movement opens with call-and-response horn duet and motif that is prominent in both this and the fourth movement.  This quickly broadens into a majestic fanfare, another recurring theme in the piece, which in reality serves as a sort of theme for Odysseus.  The final sustained note of the fanfare decrescendoes into yet another motif:  a flute/horn duet backed by a harp (usually on synthesizer), playing their own call-and-response/echo theme.  The full band returns with the fanfare before entering an aggressive section:  the woodwinds play rapid alternating triplet patterns while the brass re-enter with an entirely new, even more menacing theme.  This new theme reaches its climax and quickly repeats its first part before a rapid woodwind descent which sets the tone for the second part of the movement, "The Trojan Horse".  Like in many of his pieces, Smith has used unusual percussion instruments and effects to achieve a certain mode and image.  In this piece, he has instructed the cymbal players to grind the edge of one cymbal into the inner dome of the other, producing the sound of the squeaky wheel.  While the Greeks wheel the horse into the city, the flute/duet melody returns briefly, highlighted by an ominous clarinet choir.  The music eventually fades away, and a second effect initiates:  The "Fire" effect involves members of the band crinkling paper gently while brake drums provoke a sword fight.  The "fire" quickly spreads across the band, eventually coming to the crescendo which reintroduces the "Aggressive" theme, albeit with  more triumphant feel.  This slightly-modified theme brings the band to its final, victorious climax.  If the band is transitioning to movement II, "The Winds of Poseidon", an optional fine is supplied, in which the flute/horn duet is repeated one more time with a different ending.

Movement Two: "The Winds of Poseidon"

Movement Three: "The Isle of Calypso"
This movement picks up with Odysseus lamenting as he is stranded on the strange island belonging to the goddess Calypso.  Here, he can have anything he wants, even immortality, but he is never truly happy, as he remembers that he promised his beloved Penelope that they would grow old and die together.  After a full year, Zeus and Hermes finally persuade the saddened Calypso to let Odysseus go free, so that he can once more rule Ithaca.  This song captures the hero's woes during his time on the island.

This lyrical piece, the emotional climax of the symphony, opens with a special "Clock" effect, which can be achieved in various ways (knocking pieces of wood back and forth against each other, amplifying the sounds of a real antique clock, etc.).  A prominent cymbal scrape leads to the entrance of an Ocean drum, while the piano begins the background theme.  A mournful English Horn solo introduces the main theme of the piece, and is soon joined by a euphonium duet and the rest of the winds.  The song reaches a fake climax, before descending back into the original English Horn melody.  A flashback to the flute/horn duet in the first movement is featured, and this leads into the buildup of the band.  Finally, the climax is reached, with "soaring" woodwind lines coupled by the brass/saxophone solo.  The band joins together for a final melancholy re-statement of the English horn solo, which resumes after a dramatic fermata.  Finally, this, too, lets go, and all that is left is the waves lapping on the shore (the ocean drum) the clock ticking away (the "Clock" effect) and the tolls of the clock bells (these can either be made by tubular bells, handbells, a synthesizer, or cut helium tanks).

Movement Four: "Ithaca"
The final movement of Symphony No. 2 sharply contrasts "The Isle of Calypso" in various ways, bringing about a conclusion to the work.  The piece opens with a tense, suspenseful piano/chimes/triangle trio, interrupted at certain points by the return of the English Horn from movement 3.  After a few seconds, the tense mood subsides as the ocean drums enter and a horn duo repeat the motif that opened the symphony itself.  However, this familiarity subsides almost as quickly as the tenseness of the opening, giving way to a dramatic brass melody.  The horns continue this melody, accentuated by blasts from the rest of the band, and then all parts crescendo into the upbeat, adventurous first section.  This section is made even more epic by the fact that various parts pass the melodies between them, from the horns and saxophones to the oboes to the euphoniums.  The entire section is constantly punctuated by "biting" brass lines and unique flute/piccolo melodies which soar over the rest of the melodies and draw them back into the original dramatic theme.  Finished off by a triumphant, very short fanfare, the sections decrescendo much like they did in movements 1 and 2 as the piece enters its second section.  Smith uses a spring drum, wind wands, and wind whistles to simulate the sound of a bow being strung and arrows being released, all topped off by repetitions of "Odysseus' Theme" (the horn duet).  As the winds whistles and wind wands continue playing, bodhráns and brake drums simulate the sounds of battle, which lead into the third section.  The third section begins with a repeat of the "Aggressive" theme, once again modified, from the first movement.  Although the brass play a melody reminiscent of the first part of the song, a series of chromatic triplets lead the band back into the "Victorious" theme from movement 1.  As the chimes mimic the sound of "all the bells of Ithaca", the roaring fanfare that originally opened the symphony returns to close it, with a modified ending in which the whole band brings the song to a roaring conclusion.

Notes
 Like many of Smith's compositions, three of the four movements follow a distinct pattern:  an opening solo, followed by a fast theme, a slow theme, and another fast theme (similar to an overture).
All four movements feature at least one distinct percussive effect that gives the piece added emotion.
All four movements also begin and end in either the key of B-flat or its relative minor, with few key changes during the piece.
In his programming notes, Mr. Smith acknowledges that the continuity of the piece compared to Homer's original epic has been altered slightly, with "The Winds of Poseidon" coming before "The Isle of Calypso".  He notes that he did this to provide further contrast between the mournful third movement and the action-filled fourth movement, and states that the order of the two middle movements may be switched should the conductor desire to do so.

Percussive effects
 The Iliad
 The "Groaning and Squeaky Wheel" effect
 In order to simulate the giant Trojan Horse being wheeled into the city, two cymbals are placed in a perpendicular arrangement while the percussionist grinds the edge of one into the inner dome of the other. Two pairs of cymbals are scored in order to produce the sound of wheels on either end of the stage.
 The "Fire" effect
 As the city of Troy burns, the band softly crumples pieces of paper, "sweeping across the band" as necessary to produce a realistic "fire".
 The Winds of Poseidon
 "Lightning" effect
 Smith advises that an extra-large thundersheet be used during the first part of the second movement in order to enhance the effect of deep, rumbling thunder and flashing lightning.
 "Siren" effect
 When Odysseus hears the singing of the sirens, the percussion section uses toy "spinning tubes" cut to produce the B-flat, E-flat and F pitches in order to create an eerie effect.
 The Isle of Calypso
 "Clock" effect
 Used to symbolize the passing of time on Calypso's island, there are various ways of producing this effect. Smith suggests knocking a piece of wood between two wooden boxes with holes cut in them, or amplifying the ticking of an antique clock. The tolling of the bells may be produced by a set of chimes, a synthesizer, or even two helium tanks cut to sound a third apart.
 Ithaca
 "Odysseus and the Arrow"
 To produce the sound of arrows being released/flying by, the percussion section strikes a spring drum with a large triangle beater and bends a timpani pitch up as the bow is strung. When the arrows fly by, wind whistles and wind wands play in rapid succession, creating the illusion of arrows whizzing by at high speeds.

Compositions by Robert W. Smith
Smith, Robert W. 2
Concert band pieces
Smith, Robert W. 2
Works based on the Iliad
Works based on the Odyssey
Music based on poems
Music based on works by Homer